Lance Lamar Jeter (born July 18, 1988) is an American professional basketball player. He plays point guard and occasionally shooting guard position. Jeter played college basketball for the Nebraska Huskers at the University of Nebraska. Nicknamed "The General", he is a two-time winner of the Dutch Basketball League MVP Award during his time with Donar.

Professional career

Aris Leeuwarden
His first professional season, Jeter played for Aris Leeuwarden. He was the main scorer player of Aris, as he averaged 16.9 points per game. He was chosen to the DBL All-Star team.

Koszalin and Ulm
In 2012, he signed a contract with the Polish club AZS Koszalin but he was released quickly. He played the 2012–13 season for ratiopharm ulm, whom he competed with in the Eurocup along with the Bundesliga.

Trefl Sopot
In the 2013–14 season he returned to Poland to play for Trefl Sopot. Jeter started the season with Trefl, by winning the Polish Supercup. The team eventually took the third place in the 2013–14 PLK season.

Donar
For the 2014–15 season he signed with Dutch team Donar. With Donar, he won the NBB Cup, after the team beat SPM Shoeters in the Final. He won the Dutch Basketball League MVP Award in April. Donar's season ended after the Finals, in which the team lost 4–1 to SPM Shoeters.

Mitteldeutscher BC
On September 17, 2015, returned to the Bundesliga after Mitteldeutscher BC announced an agreement with Jeter. He left the team on January 3, 2016, after Mitteldeutscher BC honored his request to dissolve his contract. Jeter averaged 8.1 points in 17 games for the team.

Second stint with Donar
On January 13, 2016, he returned to Donar. On December 16, 2016, he scored a career-high 31 points in a DBL road loss to Aris Leeuwarden. Jeter was named to the All-DBL Team for the second time.

After a season in which Donar won the DBL championship, Jeter re-signed for another year. Jeter won his second DBL Most Valuable Player Award this season and became the seventh player to have won multiple Dutch League MVP awards.

JL Bourg

For the 2017–18 season, Jeter signed with JL Bourg of the French LNB Pro A.

Lithuania
The 2018–19 season, Jeter started with BC Pieno žvaigždės. On November 12, 2018, Jeter was released by Pieno. He averaged 7.3 points and 3.0 assists in the Lithuanian Basketball League.

Return to Donar
On November 25, 2018, he returned to Donar.

Honors

Club
Donar
Dutch Basketball League (2): 2015–16, 2016–17
NBB Cup (2): 2014–15, 2016–17
Dutch Basketball Supercup (1): 2016
Trefl Sopot
Polish Supercup (1): 2013

Individual awards
DBL Most Valuable Player (2): 2014–15, 2016–17
DBL Play-offs MVP (1): 2015–16
DBL All-First Team (3): 2014–15, 2015–16, 2017
DBL All-Star (3): 2012, 2015, 2017

Statistics

References

External links

 Lance Jeter at realgm.com

1988 births
Living people
American expatriate basketball people in France
American expatriate basketball people in Germany
American expatriate basketball people in Lithuania
American expatriate basketball people in the Netherlands
American expatriate basketball people in Poland
American men's basketball players
Aris Leeuwarden players
AZS Koszalin players
Basketball players from Pennsylvania
BC Pieno žvaigždės players
Donar (basketball club) players
Dutch Basketball League players
JL Bourg-en-Bresse players
Junior college men's basketball players in the United States
Mitteldeutscher BC players
Nebraska Cornhuskers men's basketball players
People from Beaver Falls, Pennsylvania
Point guards
Polk State College alumni
Ratiopharm Ulm players
Sportspeople from the Pittsburgh metropolitan area
Trefl Sopot players